Predator is a 2016 novel  by Wilbur Smith and Tom Cain. It was the second Smith novel written with a co-writer.

References

External links
Predator at Wilbur Smith

Novels by Wilbur Smith
2016 British novels
HarperCollins books